Chromium(IV) chloride (CrCl4) is an unstable chromium compound.  It is generated by combining chromium(III) chloride and chlorine gas at elevated temperatures, but reverts to those substances at room temperature.

References

Chromium–halogen compounds
Chlorides
Metal halides
Chromium(IV) compounds